Goniodoris brunnea is a species of sea slug, a dorid nudibranch, a marine gastropod mollusc in the family Goniodorididae.

Distribution
This species was first described from South Africa.

References

Goniodorididae
Gastropods described in 1958